Dorian Allworthy is an American representational, tonal-realist painter working in Chicago.  She is also known for her drypoint engravings.  She specializes in large figure paintings as well as still life compositions and landscapes.

Biography

Early life and training
Dorian Allworthy was born in Pennsylvania.  She attended an alternative high school in Philadelphia, and later studied at the Pennsylvania Academy of the Fine Arts. Her great uncle was mid twentieth century painter, Joseph Allworthy.

Career

Allworthy is a painter and printmaker of still lives, figures, and landscapes. Her work is held in public and private collections, including the Prints and Drawings collection of the Art Institute of Chicago.

References

External links
 https://web.archive.org/web/20110202093723/http://sievemarialucianusfineart.com/

American engravers
American landscape painters
American printmakers
Living people
Pennsylvania Academy of the Fine Arts alumni
American portrait painters
American still life painters
Tonalism
Year of birth missing (living people)
Artists from Chicago
Painters from Pennsylvania
Place of birth missing (living people)
21st-century American women artists
20th-century American women artists
21st-century American painters
20th-century American painters
American women painters
Women engravers
Women printmakers